Ladra is a village on the left bank of the Soča River near Kobarid in the Littoral region of Slovenia.

References

External links

Ladra on Geopedia

Populated places in the Municipality of Kobarid